A Special Session of the United Nations General Assembly, or UNGASS, occurs when the United Nations General Assembly meets in order to discuss an important wide-ranging topic.

Under Chapter IV, article 20 of the United Nations Charter, "Special sessions shall be convoked by the Secretary-General at the request of the Security Council or of a majority of the Members of the United Nations." The request of the Security Council requires a vote of nine or more of its fifteen members. However, since 1975, all special sessions have been called by the General Assembly.

Each special session deals exclusively with one topic with a short agenda. They are typically high-level events with the participation of heads of state and government and government ministers. A special session usually adopts one or two outcome documents, such as a political declaration, action plan or a strategy. Special sessions last from one to several days. Like a regular annual session, a special session consists of both formal and informal plenary meetings, with a Committee of the Whole negotiating the outcome document.

Procedure 
The procedure to call a special session are laid out in the Rules of Procedure of the General Assembly. The rules pertaining to special sessions are as follow:
 Rule 7:
 Allows for the General Assembly to fix a date for a special session (in accordance with Article 20 of the Charter). 
 Rule 8(a):
 Requires special sessions to be convened within fifteen days of the receipt by the Secretary-General of a request for such a session from the Security Council or from a majority of the Members of the United Nations
 Rule 9(a):
 Allows any Member State of the United Nations to request the Secretary-General convene a special session. The Secretary-General must then inform other Members of the request and inquire whether they concur with it. If a majority do within thirty days, a special session of the General Assembly shall be convened.
 Rule 10:
 Requires the Secretary-General to notify Member States, at least fourteen days in advance, of the opening of a special session convened at the request of the Security Council. This time period is changed to at least ten days in advance in the case of a session convened at the request of a majority of Members.
 Rule 16:
 Rule 17:
 Requires that the provisional agenda for a special session only consist of those items proposed for consideration in the request for the holding of the session.
 Rule 18:
 Allows for supplementary items to be added to the agenda by any Member States, principal organ of the United Nations or the Secretary-General at least four days before the date fixed for the opening of a special session. Such items are placed on a supplementary list.
 Rule 19:
 During a special session, items on the supplementary list and additional items may be added to the agenda by a two-thirds majority of the members present and voting.

Sessions

See also 
 Emergency special session of the United Nations General Assembly

References

External links 
 UNGA Special Sessions